Barbara Holdridge, together with her business partner, Marianne (Roney) Mantell, co-founded Caedmon Records in 1952. As an entirely female-owned company Caedmon stressed gender equality and focused on many women's writings.  She was a pioneer in the genre of spoken word literary recordings, and is considered to have laid the foundation for modern audio books.

Early life and education

Barbara Ann Holdridge née Cohen was born in 1929 in New York City.

Holdridge attended Hunter College in New York, receiving her BA in 1950 after majoring in Humanities.   She graduated cum laude and was elected to Phi Beta Kappa. She continued her graduate education in Humanities at Columbia University, also in New York, but then turned her attention to founding Caedmon Records with her college friend Marianne Roney, in 1952.

Caedmon Records

In 1952 Holdridge was working for Liveright Publishers in New York and Roney (later Mantell) was employed by a New York recordings producer.  When they heard that the Welsh poet Dylan Thomas was going to be speaking at the 92nd Street YMCA, they went to hear him read his poetry. The partners sent Thomas a note offering him a business proposition: to record Thomas reading his poetry and the partners would market the recording under their newly conceived record label, Caedmon Records.  Thomas agreed, and on February 22, 1952, at Steinway Hall,  Thomas, Holdridge and Mantell made history with the poet's reading of his story, “A Child's Christmas in Wales” on the A side of the album.  With this one act the partners accomplished two things, cementing the poet's career as well as birthing the audiobook industry.

The partners set up a small office in New York and began to invite other poets and authors to read their own works to be disseminated as recordings. The line-up of writers they engaged reads like a list of the best and most well-known writers of the 20th century. The pair recorded Thomas Mann, E. E. Cummings, Archibald MacLeish, Ernest Hemingway, Marianne Moore, Eudora Welty, [Thomas Mann[,[Katherine Anne Porter] and many more.   By 1959 Caedmon had revenues of $500,000,  and by 1966 Caedmon (which was named for the first known English poet)  had grossed $14 million and had 36 employees working in their 8,000 square foot office in midtown Manhattan, close to the Empire State Building.

The partners sold Caedmon in 1970 to DC Heath and Company,  a subsidiary of Raytheon. Holdridge remained with Caedmon for an additional five years as president of the reorganized company.

Post-Caedmon

Holdridge founded Stemmer House Publishers in 1975, the first general book publishers established in the state of Maryland. Stemmer published both fiction and non-fiction works.  The company became known for its children's books, and their International Design Library. In 2003 she sold Stemmer House Publishers.

Holdridge taught publishing at Loyola College as an Adjunct Professor where she taught book publishing and writing. She created Apprentice House Publishers as a hands-on learning project for her courses. The Loyola Department of Communications took it over as an ongoing publishing entity.

Recognition

In 2002 Holdridge was inducted into the National Women’s Hall of Fame and subsequently the Maryland Women's Hall of Fame. She is also and inductee of Sigma Tau Delta, the English Honorary Society. She, together with Marianne Mantell, was given a Special Lifetime Achievement Award at the Audie Awards in 2001 for founding Caedmon Records.  Together with her husband, Holdridge is recognized as the co-discoverer and researcher of the 19th century American portrait painter Ammi Phillips, whose works were on display at important museums as several different unknown American masters. Larry and Barbara Holdridge were recognized and honored by the Museum of American Folk Art for their important contribution to art. She currently continues to do research on Ammi Phillips, and is considered the authority on the artist, who is now renowned among art historians, art critics and connoisseurs of American art. Her oral account of the couple's discovery of Phillips, previously unknown, as an American master of portraiture was recorded in 2022 by the Museum of American Folk Art for its series on important American art research and researchers. For her dedication to creating its gardens and beautifying the grounds at Stemmer House Holdridge received an award from the Baltimore County Historical Trust in 2007. She is currently serving on the board of directors of Phi Beta Kappa Alumni Association of Greater Baltimore.

Personal life 
In 1959 Barbara Cohen married Larry Holdridge,  a self-employed Baltimore, Maryland hydraulic engineer,  and she then moved to Maryland.  Together they raised twin daughters, Eleanor and Diana. Holdridge is an avid gardener, having created gardens whose beauty has been recognized with awards. Her gardens have been included on tours conducted by the Maryland House and Garden Pilgrimage and the Maryland Horticultural Society.

References

1929 births
American women in business
Living people
American women record producers
21st-century American women